Tim Weaver is a retired American soccer defender who played two seasons in Major League Soccer with the San Jose Clash.

Soccer
Weaver attended the University of San Francisco where he played on the men's soccer team from 1993 to 1996.  In 1997, he turned professional with the San Francisco Bay Seals of the USISL.  In January 1998, the Richmond Kickers signed Weaver.  On February 1, 1998, the San Jose Clash selected Weaver within the first round (third overall) of the 1998 MLS Supplemental Draft.  In July 1998, Weaver had his right leg broken by a bad tackle in a friendly with Monarcas Morelia.  He had played twelve games up to that time, but lost the rest of the season.  He attempted to come back in 1999, but played only one game before being released.  In 2000, he returned to the Seals, now playing in the USL A-League, for one last season. Weaver was recalled by the San Jose Earthquakes in 2002 for 3 games during the World Cup to replace Jeff Agoos. He didn't appear in any games.

Medicine
After his retirement from soccer, Weaver pursued a career in medicine.

References

External links
 

1975 births
Living people
American soccer players
Bay Area Seals players
San Francisco Seals (soccer) players
San Francisco Dons men's soccer players
San Jose Earthquakes players
Major League Soccer players
People from Livermore, California
USL Second Division players
A-League (1995–2004) players
San Jose Earthquakes draft picks
Association football defenders